IRB Canadian content value (CCV) is the percentage of the selling price of a product or service which represents Canadian labour and materials and is potentially eligible as an offset against a Canadian Industrial Regional Benefits (IRB) obligation with the Government of Canada. Canadian content value is measured in Canadian dollars and is calculated by an IRB contractor.

Calculating CCV 

Industry Canada recommends two methods for calculating Canadian content value, depending on whether the selling price of the product or service can be substantiated: the net selling price method and the cost aggregate method.

Net Selling Price Method 

If the selling price of a product or service can be substantiated, a Canadian Industrial Regional Benefits (IRB) contractor may use the net selling price method. This   is calculated as the total selling price of the product minus any customs duties; excise taxes; GST, HST and all provincial sales taxes; and any costs associated with ineligible business activities, such as the value of goods imported into Canada.

Cost Aggregate Method 

The cost aggregate method must be used if the selling price of a product or service cannot be substantiated. In this method,   an IRB contractor aggregates the costs of parts and materials produced in Canada; Canadian transportation costs; Canadian labour costs; Canadian real estate costs; Canadian insurance costs; and several other eligible expenses.

References

External links 
 Industry Canada - Industrial Regional Benefits
 Improvement to Canada’s IRB Policy - FrontLine Defence News
 Canadian content value calculator - OMX
 Calculating CCV - YouTube

Economy of Canada